Jorman Campuzano (born 30 April 1996) is a Chilean professional footballer who plays for Brazilian  Everest futebol clube

Early life 
At the age of 15, Campuzano with a strong personality and against what his family wanted left his native town Tamalameque. He came to the city of Bogotá seeking for opportunities. He could get a job as a domicile in a chicken shop from the town of Bosa where he played his first amateur football tournaments earning fifty thousand pesos (15 dollars) for game played.

Professional career

Youth player 
He took his first steps to reach professional football at the Churta Millos Soccer School Club. Then a teacher from La Equidad offered him to play in the "Basic Forces" of that club. Later he would travel to Buenos Aires, Argentina to train at Banfield where they prepare him mentally and physically. From there he returned to Colombia to prepare with Deportivo Pereira where with just one training he was promoted to the professional team by the hand of coach Hernán Lisi.

Deportivo Pereira 
He debuted as a professional on April 15, 2015, on matchday 4 of the Colombia Cup. Despite being his first match in a professional club, he played 65 minutes against Atlético Huila in Guillermo Plazas Alcid Stadium where they lost 3 to 1.

In the following season he scored his first goal on August 2, 2016, against Atlético Fútbol Club in a 7–2 victory in the Categoría Primera B.

Atlético Nacional 
After showing a good level at Deportivo Pereira, he was contacted by coach Miguel Ángel Russo to play for Millonarios FC. However, Atlético Nacional appeared to improve the offer, so Jorman opted to sign with them.

In January 2018, he is confirmed as a new player for Atlético Nacional of the Categoría Primera A. Campuzano made his debut for Atlético Nacional on 31 January 2018 against Millonarios in the first leg of the International career

Campuzano was called up to the Chile national football team on 29 August 2018. He made his debut against Venezuela on September 8, 2018.

Honours
Atlético Nacional
Copa Colombia: 2018[

References

1996 births
People from Cesar Department
Living people
Colombian footballers
Colombia international footballers
Association football midfielders
Atlético Nacional footballers
Boca Juniors footballers
Giresunspor footballers
Categoría Primera A players
Categoría Primera B players
Argentine Primera División players
Süper Lig players
Colombian expatriate footballers
Expatriate footballers in Argentina
Colombian expatriate sportspeople in Argentina
Expatriate footballers in Turkey
Colombian expatriate sportspeople in Turkey